Qaleh-ye Bani-ye Mushemi (also Romanized as Qal‘eh-ye Banī-ye Mūshemī; also known as Qal‘eh-ye Banī) is a village in Zilayi Rural District, Margown District, Boyer-Ahmad County, Kohgiluyeh and Boyer-Ahmad Province, Iran. At the 2006 census, its population was 323, in 52 families.

References 

Populated places in Boyer-Ahmad County